Vinson is an unincorporated community in Harmon County, Oklahoma, United States. The community was named for Henry B. Vinson, townsite owner. Vinson has a post office, which was established on August 20, 1903. The post office (ZIP code 73571) was discontinued in 2017.

Notable people

Rufe Davis, actor who appeared in Petticoat Junction.
John W. Aaron (nicknamed "The Steely-Eyed Missile Man"); NASA electrical engineer credited with saving the Apollo 12 mission

References

 

Unincorporated communities in Harmon County, Oklahoma
Unincorporated communities in Oklahoma